Camarosporium is a genus of fungi belonging to the order Botryosphaeriales, family unknown.

The genus has cosmopolitan distribution.

Species
 

Species:

Camarosporium abnorme 
Camarosporium acaciigenum 
Camarosporium acanthophylli 
Camarosporium quaternatum

References 

Botryosphaeriales
Dothideomycetes genera
Dothideomycetes enigmatic taxa